The Quadricentennial Pavilion (originally UST Sports Complex) is a 5,792-seat multi-purpose gymnasium of the University of Santo Tomas (UST) located at the site of the former old Engineering Complex and adjacent football field in front of the Roque Ruaño Building.

The Quadricentennial Pavilion is one of the building construction projects of the university for its celebration of 400th year of foundation in 2011. The new sports complex replaced the old UST Gymnasium which was built in 1933.

History

Since 1933, the university only had the old UST Gymnasium, which was considered then as the biggest gymnasium during its time, as venue to hold practices for its athletes, as well as to hold non-sporting events.

In recent years, the student population increased to 40,000, prompting university officials to recognize the need for a new sporting facility within the campus.

A groundbreaking ceremony was held on July 29, 2008, after the Vatican gave its "blessing" to the project as UST is a pontifical university, directly under the supervision of the Holy See.

The location of the sports complex lies on the former site of the Engineering Sports Complex that has an open field for softball and football, outdoor basketball courts, a tennis court, a covered basketball court with bleachers, and a canteen.

It was originally named as the UST Sports Complex, but the Council of Regents announced on October 18, 2011, that the new building will be called the Quadricentennial Pavilion.

Rev. Fr. Rolando V. de la Rosa, the former Rector of the university, described the then yet to be built facility as more than just a place for events and ceremonies as it will serve as a monument to "the unique and unparalleled holistic" sports development program of the university. The facility was planned to be the home of the UST varsity players and the Growling Tigers starting academic year of 2012.

Architecture and design

The Quadricentennial Pavilion was designed by chief architect Carmelo Casas, who also designed the UST Carpark Building. The first architectural plan for the facility was made in 2007. For three years before the groundbreaking of the facility in July 2008, Millenium Sports Universal Co. coordinated with Casas in the planning and design stage where they were tasked to create a sporting facility of at least 5,000 seating capacity.

The structure has four storeys with its first floor being elevated to address potential flooding. A double wall design, by devising two walls separated by a space, was employed for the interior walls of the structure for noise insulation. To minimize solar exposure to the sports venue's interior, louvers were utilized as part of the building's façade. This feature was also used to highlight to emphasize the building's exterior.

The project manager the facility was Asian Technicon Managers & Consultants, Inc.

Features

Sports

The dance hall for the Salinggawi Dance Troupe as well as training halls for badminton, fencing, judo, table tennis, and taekwondo are located in the ground floor of the Quadricentennial Pavilion. There is also a two-level fitness center on this floor and a gymnastics room. Five lecture rooms for IPEA (Institute of Physical Education and Athletics) is also located on this floor. On the third level, the facility features a two-lane overall track encircling the building.

Four-storey sports complex mainly features a maplewood hardcourt basketball court on the second floor with rows of seats rising up to the fourth level of the building. The topmost section are accessible from the fourth level while the middle section is accessible from the third level. The court is surrounded by a tiger-stripe border with a tiger's head as another design element. The basketball venue is surrounded by orange, red and yellow seats.

In total the Quadricentennial Pavilion has a seating capacity of at least 5,792 people. local-distributor Millenium Sports Universal Co., provided retractable rows of 1,562 polyprothylene chairs. Outside the playing court, the flooring is made up of engineered wood by Robbins which was also responsible for the wooden court. Maine-base Hussey supplied the retractable rows and chairs up to the fourth level. S'portable Scoreboards supplied the 4-sided scoreboard of the facility.

Others

The second floor holds the offices for IPEA, guidance counselors, and sports science. The institute have a faculty room and other multimedia rooms for students. This floor also hosts two dug-outs and two lounges for coaches.

The new gym also serves as a museum that enshrines all the trophies, medals and other memorabilia of various UAAP championships the university has won. Championship banners will also hang from the rafters of the gymnasium. On the third level, the facility's windows holds posters and memorabilia displaying sporting events and selected Thomasian athletes.

On one side facing the Roque Ruano Building are retail spaces for banks and restaurants. The facility is also capable of hosting non-athletic events such as concerts, graduation ceremonies, conferences, and the university mass.

Utilities
Its toilets and faucets inside the lavatories and restrooms are automated and the entire vicinity is controlled by a centralized air-conditioning system. A closed circuit television (CCTV) system is also installed in selected areas within the sports venue for security. The CCTV network is controlled from the Information Technology Data room which is located in the second floor of the facility.

Campione steel sculpture
The main lobby of the facility features a steel sculpture named Campione (Spanish: champion), designed by Thomasian artist Joe Datuin. The sculptor won in the 2008 Olympic Committee Sports and Arts contest.

Events

References

University of Santo Tomas
Educational structures in Metro Manila
Indoor arenas in the Philippines
Basketball venues in the Philippines
Sports venues in Manila
Buildings and structures in Sampaloc, Manila
Sports venues completed in 2011
University sports venues in the Philippines
2011 establishments in the Philippines